John S. Goff (1931-2001) was a college professor who studied Robert Todd Lincoln and the history of Arizona. He was active in historical organizations.

Personal

Goff was born in Los Angeles, California, on June 20, 1931, to Samuel J. Goff and Elizabeth A. Wilhelm Goff and graduated from Inglewood High School in Inglewood, California, in June 1949, after which he attended Pepperdine College on its campus in Los Angeles.  He graduated from the University of Southern California, where he also received a doctorate of philosophy in history.  He died on April 8, 2001, and was survived by his mother; a daughter, Margaret Elizabeth Goff, and a son, John Swafford Goff, all of Phoenix, Arizona.

Academic career
In July 1957 Goff was appointed as an instructor in government and history at West Texas State College in Canyon, Texas.  In 1960, he next taught at Phoenix College, where he was head of the Social Sciences Department and director of the Paralegal Program. He lived in Phoenix.  He wrote books on Arizona history and the Abraham Lincoln family, and he edited the records of the Arizona Constitutional Convention of 1910.  Goff was a member of the State Bar of Arizona and the Arizona Academy and was a director of the Arizona Historical Foundation and the Central Arizona chapter of the Arizona Historical Association.  He was a member of Phi Alpha Theta,  national history fraternity; Pi Sigma Alpha, and Pi Kappa Delta.

Research

Publications
 Arizona Civilization, Hooper Publishing Corp., 185 pages with index and photos. "Dr. Goff writes with authority and detail."
 Robert Todd Lincoln, University of Oklahoma Press, 265 pages. It was "the only published biography of the president's eldest son." "Unfortunately, Goff does not make Lincoln speak. His 265 pages leave the reader tantalized but ill-informed."  online free to borrow
 George W. P. Hunt and His Arizona, Socio-Technical Publications, Pasadena, California. It "came about as a result of a visit by Dr. Goff . . . to the state library in 1961 when Alice B. Good, then librarian, told him of the Hunt collection." Hunt was the first governor of Arizona.

Studies
Goff wrote for the Microsoft Encarta Encyclopedia. He also authored a series of articles about Arizona territorial officials.

In 1985, Goff was chosen by the Illinois State Historical Library to have the first access to the twenty thousand letters which Robert Todd Lincoln wrote between 1860 and 1920 and which were discovered in 1982. They had never been studied. Goff said he would revise his already-printed book on the younger Lincoln and hoped to have the work completed in 1987.

References

1931 births
2001 deaths
University of Southern California alumni
20th-century American historians
American male non-fiction writers
Phoenix College alumni
Writers from Los Angeles
Historians from California
20th-century American male writers